Drenovac is a village in the city area of Kragujevac, Serbia. According to the 2011 census, the village has a population of 333 people.

References

Populated places in Šumadija District